A list of films produced in Pakistan in 1950 (see 1950 in film): A total of 13 films were released in the country.

See also
1950 in Pakistan

External links
 Search Pakistani film - IMDB.com
 13 Pakistani films of 1950 - pakmag.net

1950
Pakistani
Films